Michael Pickersgill Benthall CBE (8 February 1919 – 6 September 1974) was an English theatre director.

Michael Benthall was the son of the British businessman and public servant Sir Edward Charles Benthall and Ruth, Lady Benthall ( Ruth McCarthy Cable), daughter of Ernest Cable, 1st Baron Cable. 

As an undergraduate at Oxford University, Benthall met Robert Helpmann, who had been fulfilling an invitation to dance there. The two men formed a romantic relationship that was to last for 36 years. The couple lived and worked together quite openly, until Benthall's death at age 55 in 1974.

His first connection with the Old Vic was during the 1944 season when the company, owing to enemy action, had been forced to relocate to the New Theatre (now the Noël Coward Theatre) where Benthall directed a production of Hamlet jointly with Tyrone Guthrie. 

Benthall provided the scenario for two ballets by Arthur Bliss: Miracle in the Gorbals (1944), and Adam Zero (1946). He was the artistic director of the Old Vic between 1953 and 1962, and produced all of the Shakespeare plays in the First Folio over five years.

A few years later, he directed I'm Solomon, a musical remake of an Israeli musical called King Solomon and Shalmai the Shoemaker ("Shlomo ha'Melech ve'Shalmai ha'Sandlar") that ran in Jaffa in the Summer of 1967. I'm Solomon starred Dick Shawn, Salome Jens and Carmen Mathews. Ernest Gold, who had written the score for the movie Exodus (1960), wrote the music. Geoffrey Holder choreographed the show. Benthall then directed Coco starring Katharine Hepburn with music by André Previn and lyrics by Alan Jay Lerner.  Benthall then directed Her First Roman, a musical version of George Bernard Shaw's Caesar and Cleopatra.

References

1919 births
1974 deaths
People educated at Eton College
Alumni of Christ Church, Oxford
English theatre directors
Ballet librettists
Commanders of the Order of the British Empire
20th-century English LGBT people